Kentucky elected its members August 6, 1827, after the term began but before the new Congress convened.

See also 
 1826 Kentucky's 5th congressional district special election
 1826 Kentucky's 12th congressional district special election
 1827 Kentucky's 11th congressional district special elections
 1826 and 1827 United States House of Representatives elections
 List of United States representatives from Kentucky

Notes 

1827
Kentucky
United States House of Representatives